The Rockslide Formation is a geologic formation in Northwest Territories. It preserves fossils dating back to the Drumian (Plagiura-Pogiella to Bolaspidella Zone).

It was deposited in deep water on a reasonably distal slope; it contains carbonates, debris flows and siliciclastic siltstones, the latter being the fossil bearing horizons. It also contains deep-water microbial reefs.

See also

 List of fossiliferous stratigraphic units in Northwest Territories

References

 

Cambrian Northwest Territories
Cambrian northern paleotropical deposits